Chubkovichi is a rural locality (a selo) in Starodubsky District, Bryansk Oblast, Russia. The population was 374 as of 2010. There are 6 streets.

Geography 
Chubkovichi is located 16 km southwest of Starodub (the district's administrative centre) by road. Kamen is the nearest rural locality.

References 

Rural localities in Starodubsky District